Lubnów  is a village in the administrative district of Gmina Ziębice, within Ząbkowice Śląskie County, Lower Silesian Voivodeship, in south-western Poland. Prior to 1945 it was in Germany.

Attractions 
An organic farm, called Wagnerówka, welcomes people interested in organic agriculture to visit the farm and its 11 hectares.

References

Lubnow